Pulsed power is the science and technology of accumulating energy over a relatively long period of time and releasing it instantly, thus increasing the instantaneous power. They can be used in some applications such as food processing, water treatment, weapon, and medical applications.

Overview
Energy is typically stored within electrostatic fields (capacitors), magnetic fields (inductors), as mechanical energy (using large flywheels connected to special-purpose high-current alternators), or as chemical energy (high-current lead-acid batteries, or explosives). By releasing the stored energy over a very short interval (a process that is called energy compression), a huge amount of peak power can be delivered to a load. For example, if one joule of energy is stored within a capacitor and then evenly released to a load over one second, the average power delivered to the load would only be 1 watt. However, if all of the stored energy were released within one microsecond, the average power over one second would still be one watt, but the instantaneous peak power would be one megawatt, a million times greater.

Maximum Power Records

Single pulse energies as high as 100 MJ, power as high as a "few hundred terawatts" with voltages between 10 kV and 50 MV, and currents between 1 kA and 10 MA, have been achieved at least as of 2006.

Usage
Railgun is one of the example usage of pulsed power and it is still at research stage due to its complexity.

See also
Crossatron
Dipole magnet "kicker"
Electromagnetic forming
Electromagnetic pulse (EMP)
Explosively pumped flux compression generator
Ignitron
Linear transformer driver
Magnetic pulse welding
Particle accelerator
Power (physics)
Pulse-forming network
Thyratron
Triggered spark gap
Z Pulsed Power Facility, "Z machine"

Manufacturers
ABB Pulsed Power Manufacturer of semiconductor-based replacements for thyratrons

References

 
Power (physics)